The 1935 All-Ireland Junior Hurling Championship was the 18th staging of the All-Ireland Junior Championship since its establishment by the Gaelic Athletic Association in 1912.

Waterford entered the championship as the defending champions, however, they were beaten by Limerick in the Munster final.

The All-Ireland final was played on 13 October 1935 at Mountsfield Park in Catford, between Limerick and London, in what was their first ever meeting in a final. Limerick won the match by 4-09 to 3-03 to claim their first ever championship title.

Results

All-Ireland Junior Hurling Championship

All-Ireland semi-finals

All-Ireland home final

All-Ireland final

References

Junior
All-Ireland Junior Hurling Championship